List towns and villages in the Saraiya Block of Muzaffarpur district, Bihar, India.

Abhi Chhapra
Abu Chak
Ajodhpur urf Ibrahimpur
Amaitha
Amuara Chaube
Amuara Tej Singh
Anandpur
Anantpur Gangauli
Arar Lakhmipur
Arupur
Atraulia
Azizpur Belwar
Baghnagri
Bahilwara Bhual
Bahilwara Gobind
Bahilwara Rupnath
Bakhra
Balurampur urf Tilak Pakri
Banauli urf Rasalpur
Bania
Banyra Rahi
Bardaha
Barewa
Barhanpura
Basaitha
Basatpur
Basdeopur
Basra Kazi
Basra Shukul
Basti Saloni
Basu Kund
Basudeo Patti
Baudhia Tola
Baya Dih
Bela Saraiya
Berua
Bhagwanpur
Bhataulia
Birpur
Bisambharpur
Bisauli urf Bitraulia
Bisheshar Patti
Bishunpur Anant
Bishunpur Anant urf Uphraul
Bishunpur Basant urf Bishunpur
Bishunpur Basant urf Suba
Chainpur Pakri
Chak Abdul Rahim
Chak Alisher urf Basu Chak
Chak Bazo
Chak Bazo
Chak Ibrahim
Chak Mandua
Chak Rahmat
Chak Saidani
Chakda urf Chakna
Chakia urf Chak Bishunpur Anan
Chakia urf Neamapur
Chhapra Kuldip
Chhapra urf Chaku Chhapra
Chhitri
Chochaha
Damodar Chhapra
Datapur urf Pach Bhinda
Dhanauj Sheikh
Dhanrajpur urf Arar
Dhanupara
Doma Dih Bishunpur Dubiahi
Dubiahi
Gahila
Gahilo urf Barahanpur
Ghoghraha
Gidha
Ginjas
Gobindpur*Note: Two entries in the source
Golwara
Gopalpur urf Neura
GOpi Dhaut
Gopinathpur Doghra
Gopinathpur Sioria
Gorgawan Dih
Gosain Chhapra
Gurgawan
Hariharpur
Harpur
Harpur Beni
Harpur Ghaus
Jagarnathpur Doghra
Jaintpur
Jalalpur
Jalalpur Dayal
Jhujharpur
Kaila Patti
Kakrahi urf Faridabad
Kamal Chak urf Chaku Chhapra
Karhara
Khaira
Kolhua
Kuian
Kukrahia
Lalpura
Madhaul
Madhopur Chakdi
Madhuban
Madhurapur
Mahmadpur Baya
Majhwa Pakar
Mangauli
Manikpur*Note: Two entries in the source
Moghlani Chak
Munja Patrahia
Narangi Jagdish
Narangi Jiunath
Narayanpur
Pagahia
Pagahia Aima
Paigambarpur
Paruia urf Hargobindpur
Patorhi
Patrahia
Pipra Ghaus
Pokhraira
Raepura
Ragho Chhapra
Raghunathpur
Raja Rampur
Rampur Fakirana
Rampur Nagwan
Rampur Phagu
Ratanpur Dih
Ratanpura
Ratwara Chandan
Repura urf Rampur Balmi
Repura urf Rampur Bishunath
Rewa Dih
Rupauli
Sadipur
Sarae Baya urf Paharpur
Saraiya urf Bishunpur Kesho
Sarkeshpur
Serukahi
Shujawalpur
Siroi Aima
Sohila Patti
Supna
Til Bihta
Tola Nawada
Udaipur

References